Polydactylos is a monotypic moth genus in the family Drepanidae erected by Rudolf Mell in 1942. Its only species, Polydactylos aprilinus, was described in the same paper. It is found in the Chinese provinces of Zhejiang, Guangdong and Hainan and in Vietnam.

References

Moths described in 1942
Thyatirinae
Moths of Asia
Monotypic moth genera
Drepanidae genera